Lee Kyung-won (Hangul: 이경원, Hanja: 李敬元; ; born 21 January 1980 in Andong, Gyeongsangbuk-do) is a badminton player from South Korea. Lee was the women's doubles gold medallist at the 2002 Asian Games. She competed at the Olympic Games in 2000, 2004, and 2008, winning women's doubles bronze in 2004, and silver in 2008. She captured the women's doubles gold at the Asian Championships in 2003, 2004 and 2005. Lee educated at the Sungji Girls' Middle School, Sungji Girls' High School, and graduated from the Yong In University.

Achievements

Olympic Games 
Women's doubles

BWF World Championships 
Women's doubles

Asian Games 
Women's doubles

Asian Championships 
Women's singles

Women's doubles

East Asian Games 
Mixed doubles

World Junior Championships 
Girls' singles

BWF Superseries 
The BWF Superseries, which was launched on 14 December 2006 and implemented in 2007, is a series of elite badminton tournaments, sanctioned by the Badminton World Federation (BWF). BWF Superseries levels are Superseries and Superseries Premier. A season of Superseries consists of twelve tournaments around the world that have been introduced since 2011. Successful players are invited to the Superseries Finals, which are held at the end of each year.

Women's doubles

  BWF Superseries Finals tournament
  BWF Superseries Premier tournament
  BWF Superseries tournament

BWF Grand Prix 
The BWF Grand Prix had two levels, the BWF Grand Prix and Grand Prix Gold. It was a series of badminton tournaments sanctioned by the Badminton World Federation (BWF) which was held from 2007 to 2017. The World Badminton Grand Prix has been sanctioned by the International Badminton Federation from 1983 to 2006.

Women's doubles

Mixed doubles

  BWF Grand Prix Gold tournament
  BWF & IBF tournament

BWF International Challenge/Series/Satellite 
Women's singles

Women's doubles

Mixed doubles

  BWF International Challenge tournament
  BWF International Series tournament

References

External links 
 Badzine Player's Database
 
 

1980 births
Living people
People from Andong
South Korean female badminton players
Badminton players at the 2000 Summer Olympics
Badminton players at the 2004 Summer Olympics
Badminton players at the 2008 Summer Olympics
Olympic badminton players of South Korea
Olympic silver medalists for South Korea
Olympic bronze medalists for South Korea
Olympic medalists in badminton
Medalists at the 2004 Summer Olympics
Medalists at the 2008 Summer Olympics
Badminton players at the 1998 Asian Games
Badminton players at the 2002 Asian Games
Badminton players at the 2006 Asian Games
Badminton players at the 2010 Asian Games
Asian Games gold medalists for South Korea
Asian Games silver medalists for South Korea
Asian Games bronze medalists for South Korea
Asian Games medalists in badminton
Medalists at the 1998 Asian Games
Medalists at the 2002 Asian Games
Medalists at the 2006 Asian Games
Medalists at the 2010 Asian Games
Sportspeople from North Gyeongsang Province